Palumbia is a genus of hoverflies from the family Syrphidae, in the order Diptera.

Species
Subgenus: Palumbia Rondani, 1865
P. bellieri (Bigot, 1860)
P. eristaloides (Portschinsky, 1887)
P. inflata (Macquart, 1834)

Subgenus: Korinchia Edwards, 1919
P. angustiabdomena Huo, Ren & Zheng, 2007
P. pendleburyi (Curran, 1931)
P. similinova Huo, Ren & Zheng, 2007
P. simulans (Meijere, 1914)
P. sinensis (Curran, 1929)
P. tenax Thompson, 1975
P. vivax Thompson, 1975

References

External links
Photographs of Palumbia eristaloides and other Xylotini: https://corzonneveld.nl/opmaak/website.php?label=Palumbia

Diptera of Europe
Diptera of Asia
Hoverfly genera
Taxa named by Camillo Rondani